Mehed ei nuta (Estonian for Men Don't Cry) is a 1969 Estonian television comedy movie directed by Sulev Nõmmik and written by himself and Enn Vetemaa.

Influence
Together with Viimne reliikvia, Siin me oleme! and Noor pensionär, Mehed ei nuta is one of the most culturally influential movies of the Soviet era in Estonia.  Particularly memorable is the character of a hypochondriac protagonist, played by Ervin Abel.

Plot
A group of people suffering from sleeplessness are, under the guise of a resort, moved to a peninsula and subjected to work therapy. When they realise the deception, they attempt to leave the fake resort, with hilarious consequences.

Cast
Ervin Abel as Hypochondriac
Kalju Karask as Singer
Endel Pärn as Glutton
Voldemar Kuslap as Playboy
Lia Laats as Nurse
Sophie Sooäär as Farmhouse Nurse  
Ants Lauter as Managing director
Jüri Makarov as Young captain
Leo Normet as Normet
Marika Merilo as Girl
Sulev Nõmmik as Professor
Helmut Vaag as Head Lifeguard
Vello Viisimaa as Doctor

External links
Mehed ei nuta at the Estonian Public Broadcasting Archives 

SL Õhtuleht 5 July 2003: "Kiirustage, seltsimehed unetud!"

Soviet-era Estonian films
1968 films
1968 comedy films
Soviet black-and-white films
1969 comedy films
1969 films
Estonian comedy films
Soviet comedy films
Estonian black-and-white films